Moshe Levy is an author, and a survivor of the Israeli destroyer named "Eilat".

Moshe was born in Iraq in 1948. In 1951, he fled as a child with his parents from Iraq in an airlift organised by Israel, where he now lives with his family.

At age 18, after graduating high school, he was drafted into the Israeli navy and volunteered to serve aboard destroyer "Eilat".

The night in 1967 shortly after the Six days war that "Eilat" was attacked by Egyptian SS-N-2 Styx missiles, he was one of the survivors of the initial attack that sank the ship. Many of those who survived the initial attack were subsequently killed by other missiles, secondary explosions, or succumbed to sheer exhaustion.

His chilling story about the personal trauma, desperation, loneliness and anxiety in those tragic night hours, are brought together in a book, written by Moshe Levy, called "The 48th Soul."

The reason for naming his book "The 48th Soul" (or "Haneshama ha 48" in Hebrew) is explained in the book.

Nowadays, Moshe is a successful insurance consultant and a speaker, invited by many organizations in Israel to come and tell his personal story of hope and survival.
Moshe also worked as a journalist with the famous weekly publication: " Magazine HaMoshavot" in central Israel. He had a  successful weekly column that became very popular and had many followers. Later on Moshe decides to go back to his main passion of writing books.
In July 2015 he publish his new book: "Sylvie Doesn't Fit" short stories from life.
Moshe is also the brother of Yosi Saffi Levy, a popular Israeli singer in Los Angeles.

External links
The 48th Soul True story of the Israeli warship "Eilat".
 Israeli Navy Ship "Eilat" "The 48th Soul" by Moshe Levy.
Moshe Levy Moshe Levy – Writer and columnist in Israel.

Iraqi emigrants to Israel
Iraqi writers
Iraqi Jews
1948 births
Living people
Israeli memoirists
20th-century Iraqi writers
20th-century Israeli writers